Glória is a middle-class neighborhood of the city of Rio de Janeiro, Brazil. It is located between the neighbourhoods of Centro and Flamengo, Rio de Janeiro.

History 
In the 16th century, the base of Glória Hill was the site of a Tupí people village called Karioca. This village gave the name of the modern demonym of the city: carioca.

In the 17th century, the Nossa Senhora da Glória do Outeiro church was built, at the peak of Glória Hill.  A  narrow gauge funicular railway, first opened in 1945, is employed to take visitors to the top of the hill.

In 1979, the Marina da Glória was inaugurated.

References 

Neighbourhoods in Rio de Janeiro (city)
Narrow gauge railways in Brazil